C. edule may refer to:

 Cerastoderma edule, the common cockle, an edible saltwater clam species
 Cirsium edule, the edible thistle, a thistle species

See also
 Edule (disambiguation)